Yevgeni Alekseyevich Preobrazhensky (1886–1937) was a Russian revolutionary, Soviet economist and sociologist. A member of the governing Central Committee of the Bolshevik faction and its successor, the All-Union Communist Party, Preobrazhensky is remembered as a leading voice for the rapid industrialisation of peasant Russia through a concentration on state-owned heavy industry.

Closely associated with Leon Trotsky and the Left Opposition movement of the 1920s, Preobrazhensky fell afoul of Stalin. He recanted Trotskyism in 1929, but eventually joined a secret alliance with Trotsky in 1932. He was arrested in 1933 and shot in 1937 during the Great Purge.

Early years
Yevgeni Alekseyevich Preobrazhensky was born in Bolkhov, Oryol Governorate, Russia Empire on 15 February 1886 (Old Style). His father was the son of an Orthodox priest who taught for seven years in a zemstvo school before his ordination in 1883. Following his appointment as a parish priest in Bolkhov in the summer of 1883, the elder Preobrazhensky opened an elementary school for the parish at his own expense. It was in that school that Yevgeni was first educated.

In an autobiography written for the Great Russian Encyclopedia, he recalled being a very religious child and intellectually precocious child, who learnt to read at the age of four. After leaving his father's private school, Preobrazhensky spent two years attending the state-operated Bolkhov public school. He subsequently left the town to attend the classically oriented gymnasium in the provincial capital of Oryol, where Preobrazhensky remembered himself as the "second-best student in the class".

It was during his years at the Orël gymnasium that Preobrazhensky first became interested in politics, turning from the subjects taught in the classical gymnasium to reading newspapers, intellectual journals, history textbooks, and socially oriented novels. At the age of 14, he decided that he was an atheist, and rejected "the religious quackery" that he witnessed at first hand. This  brought him into conflict with his priestly father, who in 1902 was appointed dean of the network of church-run schools in Bolkhov parish. The estrangement between father and son would last for decades.

During his fifth of eight years at the gymnasium, Preobrazhensky began to accumulate illegal radical literature, including a proclamation by revolutionary students of the Ekaterinoslav Mining Institute, an account of a beating of protesting students at the hands of Cossacks, and hectographed editions of radical poetry and song lyrics. That summer, upon his return to the family home at Bolkhov, Preobrazhensky closely reviewed this and other illegal material and determined to himself become actively involved in the revolutionary movement seeking the overthrow of the Tsarist regime in Russia.

Underground revolutionary

Preobrazhensky decided to henceforth "devote a minimum of time to the gymnasium's subjects", merely enough to attain passing marks, to dedicate the bulk of his hours to the study of history and economics. Among the budding revolutionaries who were his friends was one Alexander Aleksin, the son of a local printer, whom Preobrazhensky persuaded to steal lead type from his father's printing works, with a view to establishing an illegal print shop of his own that could produce better results than a hectograph could provide.

Preobrazhensky attempted to set type for a pamphlet reproducing revolutionary song lyrics and a declaration "We Renounce the Old World," but his inferior printing equipment fell apart before he could master the process, and the type was eventually returned to Aleksin's printworks, without any printed publications being produced.

During his seventh year at the gymnasium, Preobrazhensky felt himself compelled to choose which revolutionary organisation to support, being torn between the competing strategies of the peasant-oriented Socialist-Revolutionary Party (PSR) and the Marxist Russian Social Democratic Labour Party (RSDLP). Influenced by the Communist Manifesto and The Development of Scientific Socialism work by Frederick Engels, Preobrazhensky cast his lot with the latter, believing its approach to be scientifically based. Together with two friends, Evgraf Litkens and Ivan Anisimov (who later joined the Mensheviks), Preobrazhensky declared his formal allegiance to the RSDLP late in 1903. 

After the start of the Russo-Japanese War, the Orël committee of the RSDLP issued an anti-war proclamation, which the three students were ordered to distribute. They did this by sneaking into the changing room and stuffing over 150 copies into the coat pockets of older students. The police investigated, but could not identify the culprits, and all three were accepted as members of the RSDLP.

During the summer prior to his eighth and final year at the Orël gymnasium, Preobrazhensky worked as a RSDLP propagandist to the workers of the Dyatkovo factory in Bryansky raion. Preobrazhensky was able to recruit the son of the Bryansky police to the RSDLP and successfully managed to conceal his small rotary mimeograph machine from searching authorities in a locked drawer of the inspector's own desk. Periodic meetings were held in the neighboring forest. In October 1905, Preobrazhensky was co-opted onto the Orël party committee. The RSDLP had by then split between the Bolsheviks, led by Vladimir Lenin, and Mensheviks. The 19 year Preobrazhensky was one of only two convinced Bolsheviks on the committee. 

In November 1905, Preobrazhensky traveled to Moscow where he was promoted to the position of chief propagandist for the urban Presnensky raion., and for the next 12 years, he was an itinerant professional revolutionary. He was arrested for the first time in Perm in March 1906, but released after five months. He then moved to the Ural region, which he represented at the 4th RSDLP party conference in Helsingfors (Helsinki) in November 1907. From autumn 1909, he was a member of the Bolshevik Party bureau in Irkutsk. He was arrested several times. On trial with other Bolsheviks in Yekaterinburg, he was defended by Alexander Kerensky, who in 1917 was head of the Provisional Government, until it was overthrown by the Bolsheviks.

After the February Revolution, in 1917, Preobrazhensky returned to the Urals, where he was elected to the regional party committee, which he represented at the 6th Congress of the Bolshevik Party, beginning near the end of July 1917, where he was elected as a candidate member (alternate) to the party's governing Central Committee.

Years in authority

From January 1918, Preobrazhensky was a candidate member of the Ural Provincial Committee of the Bolshevik Party. He was President of the Presidium of the Ural Regional Committee of the Communist Party from May 1918, and was in that post when Nicholas II and his family were killed in the city of Yekaterinburg, though it was the Ural Regional Soviet under Alexander Beloborodov, Boris Didkovsky and Filipp Goloshchyokin who directly ordered the execution of the Imperial Family. Nonetheless, Preobrazhensky was aware of the decision in advance, and discussed the matter with Lenin in Moscow. 

In 1918, Preobrazhensky joined the Left Communists faction, which opposed the draconian peace with Germany established by the Treaty of Brest-Litovsk. It was at this time that Preobrazhensky became closely affiliated with Nikolai Bukharin, himself a popular Left Communist leader and member of the party Central Committee.

In 1919, he co-wrote the book The ABC of Communism with Nikolai Bukharin, who would strongly disagree with him on the industrialization issue. He also wrote The New Economics, a polemical essay on the dynamics of an economy in transition to socialism, Anarchism and Communism and The Decline of Capitalism.

Preobrazhensky was elected a full member of the Central Committee of the Russian Communist Party at its 9th Congress, which opened at the end of March 1920. He was at the same time elected one of three secretaries of the Central Committee, and a member of the Orgburo. The other two party secretaries, Nikolay Krestinsky and Leonid Serebryakov were both ill during 1920-21, which meant that Preobrazhensky carried most of the work and was, in effect, the 'real master' of the party apparatus.

This was the most powerful post Preobrazhensky ever held. During 1920-21, the staff employed by the secretariat expanded to over 600, including a new section tasked with building up a card index that graded party members according to whether they were 'active and reliable', 'promising', or 'rank and file'. This system was later used by Joseph Stalin, who took over the secretariat two years later, to crush dissent within the party, which Preobrazhensky refused to do. Writing in Pravda on 22 January 1921, he declared that "This possibility of greater freedom of criticism represents one of the conquests of the revolution."

The Tenth party congress, in March 1921, was riven by a dispute over the role of the trade unions, in which Lenin and Leon Trotsky were on opposite sides, with Preobrazhensky and the other secretaries backing Trotsky. The party was also shaken by the Kronstadt rebellion, in the light of which Lenin resolved to ban organised factions within the party. All three party secretaries were sacked and lost their membership of the Central Committee. 

In 1921, Preobrazhensky was appointed President of the party's Financial Committee and Chief of the Directorate for Professional Training in the People's Commissariat of Education. Through the 1920s, he was a leading Soviet Economist, developing the plan for industrialisation of the country and an opponent of the New Economic Policy. From 1924, he was one of the editors of Pravda, and a member of the Board of People's Commissariat of Finance.

Left Opposition 
Preobrazhensky was the original leader of the Left Opposition, for a few months before Trotsky openly broke with Stalin after Lenin's death. He was the main author and leader signatory of The Declaration of 46, which called for greater freedom of dissent within the communist party, and attacked the leadership for having no strategy to deal with the current economic crisis. He was also the author of the theory of Primitive socialist accumulation, which argued that the state would have to lower the price of agricultural and increase the price of consumer goods, in order to extract the capital needed to expand soviet industry from the peasants, who made up 80 per cent of the population. He published a series of articles on the topic in Vestnik Kommunisticheskoi Akademii (Bulletin of the Communist Academy) in 1924 These ideas were later expanded at book length in a 1926 volume, The New Economics. and were the basic economic tenets of the Left, or Trotskyist opposition, which brought Trotsky and Preobrazhensky together.

Preobrazhensky visited Trotsky when he was in Berlin for medical treatment in 1926, an "interesting" fact that Stalin, noted in a letter to Molotov, after it had been reported back to him by the Ogpu. 

Preobrazhensky (and Trotsky) advocated for a rapid pace of industrialization in the context of the Soviet Union's New Economic Policy, arguing that the numerically-limited Communist Party faced a grave danger of being swamped by the richest and most powerful individuals in the villages (the so-called kulaks) and the mass of peasants who might naturally follow these local leaders. Differential pricing needed to be used, the pair claimed, with relatively high retail prices charged for textiles and manufactured goods of utility to the rural population and comparatively-low prices paid for agricultural products, thereby generating a surplus to finance industrial growth.

This program was presented polemically in opposition to the policy of the Communist Party leadership, headed in this period by Stalin and Preobrazhensky's former collaborator on the book The ABC of Communism, Nikolai Bukharin, who felt the rich peasantry to be under control and who advocated reducing prices and improving quality of textiles and manufactured goods to spur peasant production of grain and win the sympathy of the rural and urban working people for the task of socialist development.

Personality 
Trotsky's biographer, Isaac Deutscher wrote:

Victor Serge, who met Preobrazhensky in the 1920s, recalled that "he had driven himself so hard that during meetings it seemed that he might at any moment drop off to sleep; but his brain was still fresh, and crammed with statistics."

Expulsion
In 1927, the United Opposition, which now included former foes, Grigory Zinoviev, Lev Kamenev and their supporters, thrashed out a comprehensive Platform summing up their criticisms of the party line (which Trotsky published while he was in exile, under the title The Real Situation in Russia). Trotsky demanded that the Central Committee publish and circulate it in time for it to be debated at the Fifteenth Party Congress, which was to be held in December. Stalin fiercely insisted that this request be refused, but copies of the Platform were produced and circulated in defiance of the party leadership. 

On the night of September 12/13, 1927, the OGPU raided a private house and uncovered a printing press, which had been used to print this and other opposition literature. They arrested the Old Bolshevik Sergei Mrachkovsky, who was running the press, and announced that they had also caught a former officer who had fought against the Bolsheviks in the White Army of Baron Wrangel . The presence of the 'Wrangel officer' was given huge publicity in the soviet press, to discredit the left, though when the Central Committee met in October, Stalin casually admitted that he was an OGPU informer. Mrachkovsky was expelled from the party, with 11 others, on 28 September. When their case came before the Central Control Commission, Preobrazhensky and Serebryakov submitted a statement seeking to refute the slander about a 'Wrangel officer', in which they admitted to a share of responsibility for the existence of the press. For that, they were expelled from the party early in October. It was the first time that expulsion had been used against eminent Old Bolsheviks.  

On 7 November 1927, Preobrazhensky took part in a demonstration to mark the tenth anniversary of the Bolshevik revolution, but was attacked by a crowd as he tried to address a crowd from a balcony. In January 1928, he was sent to the Ural Mountains and worked in the planning agencies.

In April 1929, Preobrazhensky published an appeal entitled 'To All Comrades in Arms' in which, without repudiating the Opposition's past, he argued that since Stalin had altered the party's course and had begun rapid industrialisation of the soviet economy, the opposition now had a duty to reconcile itself to the party line. In May, he was allowed to travel to Moscow to negotiate the terms on which he and others might be allowed to return to the party. In June, he was joined  Karl Radek and Ivar Smilga. On 13 July 1929, the three of them signed a letter in Pravda declaring that they had made an "ideological and organizational break with Trotskyism". About 400 deportees followed their lead in asking to have their party membership restored.

Opposition and execution
In January 1930, Preobrazhensky was restored to membership in the Communist Party and appointed to the Nizhny Novgorod Planning Committee. In 1932, he was made a member of the Board of the People's Commissariat of the Light Industry, acting head of the People's Commissariat of State Farms. 

In an unknown date, he joined Ivan Smirnov's secret opposition group, which later by the end of 1932 entered a bloc with Leon Trotsky and some others in the USSR. He was sentenced to 3 years of exile and expelled from the party once again, but was readmitted to the party later in 1933.

In February 1934, Preobrazhensky was one of the leading ex-oppositionists who were allowed to address the 17th Party Congress. He said that he was "ashamed" to remember his part in the 7 November 1927 demonstration, praised Stalin's "tremendous insight" and "tremendous courage" and praised workers who, in the old days, ignored those who opposed Lenin and always backed him because that way "you can't go wrong".

He was arrested a second time on December 20, 1936, but unlike his old comrades, such Serebryakov, Mrachkovsky, Smirnov and Ter-Vaganyan, he was not a defendant at any of the Moscow Show Trials, though he must have been under the same pressure as they all were to make a false confession . Robert Conquest the historian of the Great Purge wrote that:

Preobrazhensky was arrested again on 2 January 1937 In July 13, 1937 he was sentenced to death by a secret tribunal and shot the same day. He was posthumously rehabilitated by the government of Mikhail Gorbachev on 22 December 1988.

Economic ideas
He argued in the new economics policy that the Soviet Union had to undertake the "primitive accumulation" that early capitalist societies had had to. That is, the peasants' agricultural surplus had to be appropriated to invest in industry. Thus, the Soviet Union had to undertake by planning in "socialist primitive accumulation" what England had undergone by happenstance in the 17th century. This theory was criticized politically and associated with Trotsky and the Left Opposition, but it was arguably put into practice by Stalin in the 1930s as when Stalin said in a speech that the Soviet Union had to accomplish in a decade what England had taken centuries to do in terms of economic development in order to be prepared for an invasion from the West. This argument is disputed by Trotskyists and Soviet historians.

References

Works

English translations
 ABC of Communism: Volume 1. With Nikolai Bukharin. Patrick Lavin, trans. Detroit, MI: Marxian Educational Society, 1921.
 Third Anniversary of the Russian Revolution. Glasgow, Scotland: Union Publishing Co., 1921.
 The New Economics. Brian Pearce, trans. London: Oxford University Press, 1965.
 From NEP to Socialism: A Glance into the Future of Russia and Europe. Brian Pearce, trans. London: New Park Publications, 1973.
 The Crisis of Soviet Industrialization: Selected Essays. Donald A. Filtzer, ed. London: Macmillan, 1980.
 The Decline of Capitalism. Richard B. Day, trans. Armonk, NY: M.E. Sharpe, 1985.
 The Preobrazhensky Papers: Archival Documents and Materials: Volume I, 1886-1920. [2014] Richard B. Day and Mikhail M. Gorinov, trans and eds. Chicago: Haymarket Books, 2015.

In Russian
 О крестьянских коммунах. (Разговор коммуниста-большевика с крестьянином) (On Peasant Communes: Conversation of a Communist-Bolshevik with a Peasant). Moscow: Kommunist, 1918.
 Нужна ли хлебная монополия? (Do We Need a Grain Monopoly?) Moscow: Izdatel'stvo Vserossiiskogo Tentral'nogo Ispolitel'nogo Komiteta Sovetov R., S., K. i K. Deputatov, 1918.
 С кем идти крестьянской бедноте? (With Whom Will the Peasant Poor March?) Smolensk: 1918.
 Крестьянская Россия и социализм. (К пересмотру нaшeй aграрнoй программы) (Peasant Russia and Socialism: Towards Revision of Our Agrarian Program). Petrograd: Priboi, 1918.
 Азбука коммунизма: Популарное объяснение программы Российской коммунистической партий  большевиков (The ABC of Communism: A Popular Explanation of the Program of the Russian Communist Party of Bolsheviks). With N.I. Bukharin. Moscow: Gosudarstvennoe izdatelʹstvo, 1920.
 Трёхлетие Октябрьской революции (Third Anniversary of the Russian Revolution). Moscow: Gosudarstvennoe izdatelʹstvo, 1920.
 "Перспективы новой экономической политики" (Perspectives on the New Economic Policy). Krasnyi nov', (1921) No. 3, pp. 201–212.
 Анархизм и коммунизм (Anarchism and Communism). Moscow: Gosudarstvennoe izdatel'stvo, 1921.
 Бумажные деньги в эпоху пролетарской диктатуры (Paper Money in the Epoch of Proletarian Dictatorship). Tiflis, Georgia: Gosudarstvennoe izdatel'stvo, 1921.
 Финансы в эпоху диктатуры пролетариата (Finances in the Epoch of the Dictatorship of the Proletariat). Moscow: People's Commissariat of Finance, 1921.
 Вопросы финансовой политики (Questions of Financial Policy). Moscow: Gosudarstvennoe izdatel'stvo, 1921.
 "Русский рубль за время войны и революции" (The Russian Ruble in Time of War and Revolution).  Krasnyi nov', (1922) No. 3, pp. 242–257.
 "Крах капитализма в Европе" (The Collapse of Capitalism in Europe). Krasnyi nov', (1922) No. 5, pp. 151–165.
 Причины падeния курса нашего рубля (Reasons for the Declining Course of Our Ruble). Moscow: People's Commissariat of Finance, 1922.
 Ot NEPa k sot︠s︡ializmu (vzgli︠a︡d na budushchee Rossii i Evropy) (From NEP to Socialism: View of the Future of Russia and Europe). Moscow: Moskovskii rabochii, 1922.
 Итоги Генуезской кoнфerenции и хoзияственные перспективы Европы (Results of the Genoa Conference and the Economic Prospects of Europe). Moscow: Gosudarstvennoe izdatelʹstvo, 1922.
 О морали и классовых нормах (On Morals and Class Norms). Moscow-Petrograd: 1923.
 О нем (About Him). Moscow: Gosizdat, 1924.
 В.И. Ленин: Сoциолoгичeский набросок (V.I. Lenin: A Sociological Sketch). Moscow: Krasnyi nov', 1924.
 Русские финансы и европеиская биржа в 1904-1906 г.г. (Russian Finances and European Market in 1904-1906). Moscow: Moskovskii rabochii, 1926.
 Экономика и финансы современной Франции (Economics and Finances of Contemporary France). Moscow: Izdatel'stvo Kommunisticheskoi akademii, 1926.
 Новая экономика: Опыт теоретического анализа советского хозяиства (The New Economics: Experience of the Theoretical Analysis of the Soviet Economy). Moscow: Izdatel'stvo Kommunisticheskoi akademii, 1926.
 Закат капитализма: Воспроизводство и кризисы при империализме и мировой кризис 1930-1931 г.г. (The Sunset of Capitalism: Reproduction and Crises associated with Imperialism and the World Crisis of 1930-1931). Moscow: 1931.

Further reading
 Richard B. Day and Mikhail M. Gorinov, The Preobrazhensky Papers: Archival Documents and Materials: Volume I: 1886-1920. Brill, 2014 
 Robert C. Allen, Farm to factory: A reinterpretation of the Soviet industrial revolution (Princeton University Press, 2003) ch 9.
 Edward Hallett Carr, A History of Soviet Russia: Socialism in One Country, 1924-1926: Volume II. London: Macmillan, 1959.
 Edward Hallett Carr, A History of Soviet Russia: Foundations of a Planned Economy, 1926-1929: Volume II. London: Macmillan, 1971.
 Stephen F. Cohen, Bukharin and the Bolshevik Revolution: A Political Biography 1888-1938. New York: Alfred A. Knopf, 1973.
 Richard B. Day, "Preobrazhensky and the Theory of the Transition Period," Soviet Studies, vol. 27, no. 2 (April 1975), pp. 196–219. In JSTOR
 Isaac Deutscher, The Prophet Unarmed: Trotsky, 1921-1929. New York: Oxford University Press, 1959.
 Isaac Deutscher, The Prophet Outcast: Trotsky, 1929-1940. New York: Oxford University Press, 1963.
 Alexander Erlich, The Soviet Industrialization Debate, 1924-1928. Cambridge, MA: Harvard University Press, 1967.
 M.M. Gorinov, S.V. Tsakunov, and Konstantin Gurevich, "Life and Works of Evgenii Alekseevich Preobrazhenskii," Slavic Review, vol. 50, no. 2 (1991), pp. 286–296. In JSTOR
 Michalis Hatziprokopiou, and Kostas Velentzas. "Preobrazhensky and the theory of economic development." The Canon in the History of Economics (Routledge, 2000) pp. 196-211.
 Moshe Lewin, Political Undercurrents in Soviet Economic Debates: From Bukharin to the Modern Reformers. Princeton, NJ: Princeton University Press, 1974.
 James R. Millar, "A Note on Primitive Accumulation in Marx and Preobrazhensky," Soviet Studies, vol. 30, no. 3 (July 1978), pp. 384–393. In JSTOR
 Alec Nove, The Soviet Economic System. Second Edition. London: George Allen & Unwin, 1977.

External links
 "Evgenii A. Preobrazhensky Archive". Marxists Internet Archive.

1886 births
1937 deaths
People from Oryol Oblast
People from Bolkhovsky Uyezd
Old Bolsheviks
Central Committee of the Communist Party of the Soviet Union members
Head of Propaganda Department of CPSU CC
Regicides of Nicholas II
Russian Trotskyists
Russian economists
Russian Marxists
Russian atheists
Great Purge victims from Russia
Members of the Communist Party of the Soviet Union executed by the Soviet Union
Soviet rehabilitations
Left Opposition